Dakamavand-e Olya (also Romanized as Dakāmavand-e ‘Olyā; also known as Dakāmavand) is a village in Yusefvand Rural District, in the Central District of Selseleh County, Lorestan Province, Iran. At the 2006 census, its population was 778, in 158 families.

References 

Towns and villages in Selseleh County